João Carlos Hatoa Nunes (born 8 March 1968 in Beira) is a Mozambican priest and Bishop of Chimoio.

Nunes received his ordination to the priesthood on 17 July 1995. Pope Benedict XVI appointed him as an auxiliary bishop of Maputo and as the Titular Bishop of Amudarsa on 25 May 2011. The Archbishop of Maputo, Francisco Chimoio, consecrated him on July 10 of that year as bishop; the co-consecrators were Adriano Langa, Bishop of Inhambane and Lucio Andrice Muandula, Bishop of Xai-Xai. On 14 January 2012, he was appointed Apostolic Administrator in Beira, but resigned from that position on 29 June 2012 when an archbishop was appointed to that see. He was appointed Bishop of Chimoio in 2017 by Pope Francis.

References

External links

21st-century Roman Catholic bishops in Mozambique
1968 births
Living people
People from Beira, Mozambique
Roman Catholic bishops of Chimoio
Bishops appointed by Pope Benedict XVI